Cavallo is an unincorporated community in Coshocton County, in the U.S. state of Ohio.

History
Cavallo was laid out in 1836 when the Walhonding Canal was extended to that point.

References

Unincorporated communities in Coshocton County, Ohio
Unincorporated communities in Ohio